Robert Madden Hill (January 13, 1928 – October 19, 1987) was a United States circuit judge of the United States Court of Appeals for the Fifth Circuit and a United States district judge of the United States District Court for the Northern District of Texas.

Education and career

Born in Dallas, Texas, Hill received a Bachelor of Business Administration degree from the University of Texas in 1948 and a Bachelor of Laws from the University of Texas School of Law in 1950. He was in private practice in Dallas from 1950 to 1970.

Federal judicial service

On October 7, 1970, Hill was nominated by President Richard Nixon to a new seat on the United States District Court for the Northern District of Texas created by 84 Stat. 294. He was confirmed by the United States Senate on November 25, 1970, and received his commission on December 1, 1970. His service terminated on July 20, 1984, due to elevation to the Fifth Circuit.

On June 4, 1984, President Ronald Reagan nominated Hill to a seat on the United States Court of Appeals for the Fifth Circuit vacated by Judge John Robert Brown. Hill was confirmed by the Senate on June 15, 1984, and received his commission the same day. He served in that capacity until his death.

Death

Hill died on October 19, 1987 of an asthma attack, while on a flight from Africa. He and his wife had been returning from a vacation in Kenya.

References

Sources
 

1928 births
1987 deaths
Judges of the United States District Court for the Northern District of Texas
United States district court judges appointed by Richard Nixon
Judges of the United States Court of Appeals for the Fifth Circuit
United States court of appeals judges appointed by Ronald Reagan
20th-century American judges
University of Texas alumni
University of Texas School of Law alumni
People from Dallas
Texas lawyers